"Soft and Wet" is a song performed by American musician Prince. It was his first solo single, released on June 7, 1978, his 20th birthday, from his debut album, For You. The track contains drums, bass guitar and synthesizers. The lyrics were co-written by Chris Moon, the producer-songwriter-engineer who discovered Prince in Minneapolis. The song was released in Barbados, South Africa, and the United States by Warner Bros. Records. There also exists a promotional, not-for-sale version of the 7" vinyl single that contains both a mono version and stereo version of the song. The song peaked at 92 on the Billboard Hot 100 on November 25, 1978, after two weeks on the chart.

A disco mix of the song served as the B-side to a 12" single vinyl that also contained a disco mix of the Prince song "Just as Long as We're Together."

Track listing
A. "Soft and Wet" – 3:01
B. "So Blue" – 4:26

Charts

Cover versions
R&B singer N'dambi covered the song for her 2005 album A Weird Kind of Wonderful (it appears on the Japan-only issue of said album).

Samples
MC Hammer sampled "Soft and Wet" in "She's Soft and Wet," from the album Please Hammer, Don't Hurt 'Em.

References

Prince (musician) songs
1978 debut singles
Songs written by Prince (musician)
Warner Records singles
Song recordings produced by Prince (musician)
1977 songs